Poropuntius angustus is a species of cyprinid fish. It is endemic to the Mekong Basin and is currently only known from a few tributaries of Mekong in Laos (Nam Ou, Nam Tha and Nam Youan). It grows to  SL. It lives mainly in small forest streams.

References 

angustus
Fish of the Mekong Basin
Fish of Laos
Endemic fauna of Laos
Fish described in 2000
Taxa named by Maurice Kottelat